Philipp Patrick Hannes Plein (born 16 February 1978) is a German fashion designer, and the founder of the Philipp Plein International Group, which includes the Philipp Plein, Plein Sport, and Billionaire brands.

Career

Plein studied law before designing luxury dog beds. In 1998, he founded Philipp Plein International Group in Munich, Germany.

Plein is listed as one of the richest individuals in Switzerland in 2019 by Bilanz in their annual Die 300 Reichsten (Top 300 Richest) with a net worth of 300 million CHF.

Brand

Plein's first collections were vintage military jackets which he embroidered with Swarovski skulls and sold at the Maison et Objet in Paris.

2006, an unnamed accessories line was introduced.

2008, the "Couture" collection was launched.

2009, the first store was opened in Monte Carlo, and the first commercial showroom was open in Milan.

2010, Plein boutiques opened in Vienna, Moscow, St. Tropez, Cannes, and Kitzbuhel in addition to the opening of a showroom in Düsseldorf.

2011, the Hong Kong showroom was inaugurated.

2012, ten boutiques were opened, in Marbella, Moscow Crocus, Baku, Milan, Dubai, St. Petersburg, Seoul, Macau, Amsterdam, and Berlin.
  
Also in 2012, Plein signed an agreement with the soccer team AS Roma to dress the team players starting with the 2012/13 season and continued to do so 4 consecutive seasons.

2013, the grand opening of stores in  Porto Cervo, Moscow, Paris, Miami, Casablanca, Courchevel, Kyiv, Hangzhou, Seoul, and New York.

2014, store openings include Hong Kong, Los Angeles, New York, Ibiza, Bodrum, Doha, London, and the first Plein duty free at the Vienna airport.

2019 marked the 20th anniversary of the Philipp Plein brand. The anniversary was celebrated with multiple special fashion shows.

Spring/Summer 2020 was presented at Social Music City in Milan in June 2019. A post-modern fashion show inspired by Mad Max Fury Road.

Celebrities and special collaborations

Notable celebrities that have worked with Plein include Mischa Barton, Lindsay Lohan, Snoop Dogg, Rita Ora, Naomi Campbell, Iggy Azalea, Grace Jones, Theophilus London, Fergie, Chris Brown,  Jeremy Meeks, Paris Hilton, Mauro Icardi, Alec Monopoly, and Floyd Mayweather.

In 2022, he released a shoe collaboration with Snoop Dogg called Philipp Plein X Snoop Dogg.

Plein told Women's Wear Daily about the sneaker collaboration with Snoop Dogg: “There are a lot of brands who collaborate with people just for money. It's nice to have a relationship with people who really like what you’re doing. And the other way around.…That is what it’s all about."

NFT collection and Metaverse marketplace 
Plein made his entrance into the Web3 space in collaboration with Portion, a blockchain auction house, as well as 3D visual artist, Antoni Tudisco.

Awards
 2007 Winner of the GQ Awards National Brand of the Year
 2008 Winner of the New Faces Award in the category Fashion
 2014 Winner of the International Fashion Brand award at Esquire Middle East Man at his Best Fashion Awards
 2016 Winner of GQ Germany Man of the Year Award in Fashion
2018 Winner of the GQ British Man of the Year - Brand of the year at the TATE modern museum in London

References

External links

 

Living people
German fashion designers
Businesspeople from Munich
High fashion brands
1978 births
People from Munich